Dylan Ryan (born April 21, 1981 in San Francisco, California) is an American pornographic actress.

Adult film career
Ryan began her pornographic career in 2004. Fellow pornographic actress Shine Louise Houston started a porn company, and Ryan starred in the first film for the company because she had made that promise to Houston when she was younger. Ryan was a stripper before entering the adult film industry; and she considers herself a “porn superhero” rather than a porn star.

Personal life
Ryan identifies herself as queer, and she has stated to be attracted to people of all gender identities. She says that her favorite porn actress is Belladonna.

Outside of porn, Ryan holds a Master of Social Work and is active as an advocate for sex workers. She is also a relationship therapist.

Awards and nominations

References

External links

 

1976 births
American pornographic film actresses
American LGBT actors
Living people
Actresses from San Francisco
BDSM people
Pornographic film actors from California
Queer pornographic film actors
Queer women
LGBT people from California
21st-century LGBT people
21st-century American women